Averøy is a municipality in Møre og Romsdal county, Norway. It is part of the region of Nordmøre. The administrative centre of the municipality is the village of Bruhagen. Other villages in the municipality include Bremsnes, Kornstad, Kvernes, Kårvåg, Langøy, Sveggen, and Vebenstad.

The municipality includes the main island of Averøya and the many small islands surrounding it. The Kornstadfjorden, Kvernesfjorden, and Bremsnesfjorden surround the municipality on three sides and the open ocean on the fourth side. The Hestskjær Lighthouse and Stavnes Lighthouse are located in the northern part of the municipality.

The  municipality is the 312th largest by area out of the 356 municipalities in Norway. Averøy is the 164th most populous municipality in Norway with a population of 5,828.

General information

The municipality of Averøy was established on 1 January 1964 when the former municipality of Kvernes and most of the municipalities of Kornstad and Bremsnes were merged into one large municipality. On 1 January 1983, the small island of Eldhusøya (and the small surrounding islands) was transferred from Eide Municipality to Averøy Municipality.

Name
The municipality is named after the island Averøya (or Averøy). The meaning of the first element is unknown (maybe afr which means "great" or "big") and the ending -øya or -øy means "island".

Coat of arms
The coat of arms was granted on 4 April 1986. The arms show three Stone Age arrowheads in gold on a red background. The arrowheads refer to actual arrowheads, made of slate, which have been found in the municipality. The arrowheads thus symbolize the long time that the area has been inhabited.

Churches
The Church of Norway has three parishes within the municipality of Averøy. It is part of the Ytre Nordmøre deanery in the Diocese of Møre.

History
The municipality of Averøy has many historic landmarks, like the Bremsnes cave with Mesolithic findings from the Fosna culture. Langøysund, now a remote fishing community, was once a bustling port along the main coastal route, and the site of the Compromise of 1040 between King Magnus I and the farmers along the coast. Also, the Medieval Kvernes Stave Church (built around 1300–1350).

Government
All municipalities in Norway, including Averøy, are responsible for primary education (through 10th grade), outpatient health services, senior citizen services, unemployment and other social services, zoning, economic development, and municipal roads. The municipality is governed by a municipal council of elected representatives, which in turn elect a mayor.  The municipality falls under the Møre og Romsdal District Court and the Frostating Court of Appeal.

Municipal council
The municipal council of Averøy is made up of 23 representatives that are elected to four year terms. The party breakdown of the council is as follows:

Mayor
The mayors of Averøy (incomplete list):
2015–present: Ingrid Ovidie Rangønes (Ap)
2011-2015: Ann-Kristin Sørvik (Sp)
2007-2011: Jarle Haga (V)
2003-2007: Kjell Magne Sandø (Ap)
1997-2003: John Harry Kvalshaug (Sp)
1986-1997: Leif Helge Kongshaug (V)
1984-1985: Eilif Aae (Sp)
1979-1983: Jarle Haga (V)

Transportation

The tourist attraction Atlanterhavsveien (Atlantic Ocean Road) connects the island and municipality of Averøy to the neighboring Eide Municipality, which is on the mainland to the west. The Storseisundet Bridge crosses the municipal boundary. In 2005, it was awarded the "Building of the Century" prize by the Norwegian Construction Industry. On the other side of the island near the village of Sveggen, Averøy is connected to Kristiansund Municipality via the undersea tunnel. This tunnel, known as Atlanterhavstunnelen (Atlantic Tunnel), was completed in December 2009, replacing the ferry from Bremsnes on Averøya to the city of Kristiansund.

Notable people 
 Erling Kristvik (1882 in Kornstad – 1969) a Norwegian educationalist
 Aud Inger Aure (born 1942 in Averøy) a Norwegian politician and Mayor of Kristiansund
 Gunnar Kjønnøy (born 1947 in Averøy) an economist and County Governor of Finnmark, 1998 to 2016
 Leif Helge Kongshaug (born 1949 in Averøy) a Norwegian politician, Mayor of Averøy, 1986 to 1997
 Magne Hoseth (born 1980 in Averøy) a coach and former footballer with 423 club caps and 22 for Norway

Gallery

References

External links

Municipal fact sheet from Statistics Norway 

 
Nordmøre
Municipalities of Møre og Romsdal
1964 establishments in Norway